The Sunny South was a weekly literary magazine published in Atlanta from 1874 to 1907.

Colonel John H. Seals began publishing the Sunny South on November 7, 1913. The paper featured prominent poetry and fiction, and covered news stories throughout Georgia. Clark Howell, C.C. Nicholls, and James K. Holliday purchased the paper in April 1892. The following year, the paper was published as supplement to the Sunday editions of the Atlanta Constitution. In 1895, the Sunny South became the first publication in Atlanta to endorse the cause of suffrage for women. author Joel Chandler Harris absorbed the Sunny South into his new publication, the Uncle Remus Magazine, in May 1907.

Notes

References
 Moore, L. Hugh. The Georgia Review, Volume XIX, Number 2, Summer 1965, p. 176.
 Elizabeth Cady Stanton, Susan B. Anthony, Matilda Joslyn Gage, Ida Husted Harper. History of Woman Suffrage, six volumes. New York: Fowler & Wells, 1881–1902.

External links
 Atlanta Historic Newspapers Archive, Digital Library of Georgia

1874 establishments in Georgia (U.S. state)
1907 disestablishments in the United States
Defunct magazines published in the United States
History of Atlanta
Magazines established in 1874
Magazines disestablished in 1907
Magazines published in Atlanta
Newspaper supplements
Weekly magazines published in the United States